Trumbull may refer to:

Places

United States
 Trumbull County, Ohio
 Trumbull Township, Ashtabula County, Ohio
 Trumbull, Connecticut
 Trumbull, Nebraska
 Fort Trumbull, Connecticut
 Mount Trumbull Wilderness in Arizona

People

Surname
 Donald Trumbull (1909–2004), American motion picture special effects artist
 Douglas Trumbull (1942–2022), American film director
 Henry Clay Trumbull (1830-1903), American clergyman and author
 James Hammond Trumbull (1821-1897), American philologist
 J. Gunnar Trumbull, American economist
 John Trumbull (1756-1843), American painter
 John Trumbull (poet) (1750-1831), American poet
 John H. Trumbull (1873-1961), Governor of Connecticut
 Jonathan Trumbull (1710-1785), Governor of both the Colony and State of Connecticut 
 Jonathan Trumbull Jr. (1740-1809), second Speaker of the U.S. House of Representatives, and Governor of Connecticut
 Joseph Trumbull (commissary general) (1737–1778), of the Continental Army during the American Revolutionary War
 Joseph Trumbull (governor) (1782-1861), American lawyer and Governor of Connecticut
 Lyman Trumbull (1813-1896), American jurist and politician
Pennie Lane Trumbull (born 1954), American philanthropist and entrepreneur
 William Trumbull (diplomat) (c. 1575 – 1635), English diplomat, administrator and politician
 William Trumbull (1639-1716), English statesman

Given name
Trumbull Cary (1787-1869), American banker, lawyer and politician
Trumbull Stickney (1874–1904), American classical scholar and poet

Fictional characters
 Thomas Trumbull, a member of the Black Widowers, a fictional men-only dining club created by Isaac Asimov

Other uses
Trumbull College, a residential college of Yale University